Tetraphalerus is a genus of beetles in the family Ommatidae, It is currently known from two extant species native to South America and several fossil species from the Jurassic and Cretaceous of Asia.

Systematics 

According to Kirejtshuk, 2020.

 †Tetraphalerus brevis Ponomarenko, 1964 Karabastau Formation, Kazakhstan, Oxfordian
Tetraphalerus bruchi Heller, 1913, recent, Northern Argentina
 †Tetraphalerus collaris Ponomarenko, 1997 Dzun-Bain Formation, Mongolia, Aptian
 †Tetraphalerus glabratus Ponomarenko, 1997 Togo-Khuduk Formation, Mongolia, Bajocian/Bathonian
 †Tetraphalerus largicoxa Lin Qibin, 1986 Guanyintan Formation, China Toarcian/Aalenian
 †Tetraphalerus mongolicus Ponomarenko, 1986 Gurvan-Eren Formation, Mongolia, Aptian
 †Tetraphalerus notatus Ponomarenko, 1997 Dzun-Bain Formation, Mongolia, Aptian
Tetraphalerus wagneri Waterhouse, 1901, recent, South America

Formerly assigned species 

 †Tetraphalerus antiquus Ponomarenko, 1964 assigned to Allophalerus
 †Tetraphalerus bontsaganensis Ponomarenko, 1997 assigned to Allophalerus
 †Tetraphalerus brevicapitis Pononarenko & Martinez-Delclos, 2000 considered indeterminate by Kirejtshuk, 2020
 †Tetraphalerus fentaiensis (Ren, 1995) assigned to Monticupes
 †Tetraphalerus grandis Ponomarenko, 1964 assigned to Omma
 †Tetraphalerus incertus Ponomarenko, 1969 assigned to Allophalerus
 †Tetraphalerus laetus Lin Qibin, 1976 assigned to Zygadenia 
 †Tetraphalerus latus Tan et al. 2007 assigned to Allophalerus
 †Tetraphalerus lindae Jarzembowski et al. 2017 assigned to Bukhkalius
 †Tetraphalerus longicollis Ponomarenko, 1997 assigned to Omma
 †Tetraphalerus maximus Ponomarenko, 1968 assigned to Allophalerus
 †Tetraphalerus okhotensis Ponomarenko in Cromov et al., 1993 assigned to Allophalerus
 †Tetraphalerus oligocenicus (Crowson, 1962) assigned to Tetraphalerites
 †Tetraphalerus tenuipes Ponomarenko, 1964 assigned to Allophalerus
 †Tetraphalerus verrucosus Ponomarenko, 1966 assigned to Allophalerus
 †Tetraphalerus surrectus (Ren, 1995) assigned to Monticupes

References

Ommatidae
Archostemata genera